Sunshine Sally is a 1922 Australian silent film directed by Lawson Harris set in the Sydney suburb of Woolloomooloo. Most of the movie survives today.

Plot
Sal and Tottie are sacked from their jobs in a laundry, then go on a picnic with friends Skinny and Spud. Skinny and Spud are both romantically interested in Sal but she spurns their attentions.

Sal is rescued in the surf Coogee Beach by wealthy lifeguard Basil Stanton and taken to his family home in Potts Point to recuperate. Sal and Basil fall in love and get married. Spud and Skinny are arrested for drunkenness and reform. Spud marries Tottie and Skinny marries a woman from the Salvation Army.

Cast
Yvonne Pavis as Sal
Joy Revelle as Tottie Faye
John Cosgrove as Spud Murphy
Dinks Patterson as Skinny Smith
Mrs Hutton as Katie Smith
J. P. O'Neill as Bill Smith
Sheila Moore as Mrs Constance Stanton
Lionel Lunn as Basil Stanton
Mervyn Barrington as James Stanton
Maude Ranier as Salvation Army woman

Production
The film was shot in October and November 1922 under the title Winnie of Woolloomooloo.

Vaudevillean Dinks Patterson, of Dinks and Onkus, made his film debut.

Some studio interiors were shot late at night because John Cosgrove was appearing on stage each day in the city. Scenes were shot at Long Bay Gaol.

One of the actors quit during filming.

Reception
The movie was not a success at the box office and Harris and Pavis soon left Australia to return to the US. However film writers Andrew Pike and Ross Cooper praised the film:
It is clearly a work of confident professionalism, offering a perceptive portrait of a distinctively Australian lifestyle. The American star, Yvonne Pavis, and her American director, Lawson Harris, had not only sympathy and clarity of vision but also the ability to express themselves effectively on film, creating credible characters and capturing thoroughly colloquial dialogue in the inter titles.

One reviewer said it was the "best picture" made in Australia.

References

External links

Sunshine Sally' at National Film and Sound Archive

1922 films
Australian drama films
Australian black-and-white films
Australian silent feature films
1922 drama films
Silent drama films
1920s English-language films